Forest Home Cemetery is at 863 S. DesPlaines Ave, Forest Park, Illinois, adjacent to the Eisenhower Expressway, straddling the Des Plaines River in Cook County, just west of Chicago.  The cemetery traces its history to two adjacent cemeteries, German Waldheim (1873) and Forest Home (1876), which merged in 1969.

The cemetery is known for its Haymarket Martyrs' Monument and surrounding gravesites.

History 
Forest Home Cemetery was the site of a Potawatomi village and burial ground until 1835. Ferdinand Haase, founder of Forest Park, and other members of the Haase family are buried on what at one time also was a Haase family homestead. The cemetery was formally established and incorporated under the laws of the State of Illinois in 1876.

The German Waldheim Cemetery was organized by a group of German Masonic Lodges in 1873 with the first interment on May 9, 1873. The Waldheim Cemetery was established as a non-religion-specific cemetery, where Freemasons, Romani, and German-speaking immigrants to Chicago could be buried without regard for religious affiliation.

The two adjacent cemeteries merged on February 28, 1969, with the combined cemetery being called Forest Home (Waldheim means "forest home" in German).

Jewish Waldheim Cemetery, located across the street, is a separate cemetery and is not affiliated with Forest Home.

Haymarket Memorial 

The "Haymarket martyrs", as the five defendants sentenced to death in the Haymarket affair came to be called among their sympathizers, were buried at Waldheim because since its establishment, it had a policy of not discriminating on the basis of race, ethnicity, or politics. In addition, it was the only Chicago-area cemetery that would accept their remains. After their burial, the cemetery became a place of pilgrimage for anarchists, leftists, and union members. In 1893, the Haymarket Martyrs' Monument, designed by sculptor Albert Weinert, was erected.

In homage to the Haymarket martyrs, other anarchists and socialists later chose to be buried at Waldheim, well into the 20th century, including:

Other notable interments 
The cemetery also includes the graves of:
Harry Aleman (mobster)
 Billy Sunday (evangelist, prohibitionist, baseball player)
 Doris Humphrey (modern dance pioneer)
 Paul Harvey, (radio announcer)
 Belle Gunness (serial killer)
 Father, mother, and grandparents of author Ernest Hemingway
 Joseph Carter Corbin (educator and founder of the University of Arkansas at Pine Bluff) and his wife, Mary Jane Corbin and sons, John Ward Corbin and William H. Corbin.
The cemetery is also the final resting place for 45 victims of the 1903 Iroquois Theater fire that killed over 600.

See also
 Burials at Forest Home Cemetery (category)
 List of cemeteries in Cook County, Illinois
 Chicago Helicopter Airways Flight 698 crashed at the cemetery in 1960

References

External links

 Forest Home Cemetery  official website
 Forest Home Cemetery at Graveyards.com
 Forest Home Cemetery Overview
 
  – the nearby cemetery with similar name

Cemeteries in Cook County, Illinois
Freemasonry in the United States
German cemeteries
German-American culture in Chicago
Romani in the United States
Forest Park, Illinois
1969 establishments in Illinois
Masonic cemeteries
Cemeteries established in the 1870s